Robert Olesen (11 June 1967) is an American bobsledder who competed in the late 1990s. At the 1997 FIBT World Championships in St. Moritz, he won bronze medals in both the two-man and the four-man events.

At the 1998 Winter Olympics in Nagano, Olesen finished seventh in the two-man event and 12th in the four-man event.

Olesen is currently the Head Men's and Women's Track and Field and Cross Country coach at University of North Carolina Charlotte.

References
Bobsleigh two-man world championship medalists since 1931
Bobsleigh four-man world championship medalists since 1930
1998 bobsleigh two-man results
1998 bobsleigh four-man results
 UNC Charlotte Team Roster - Coach Robert Olesen

American male bobsledders
Bobsledders at the 1998 Winter Olympics
Year of birth missing (living people)
Living people
Olympic bobsledders of the United States
20th-century American people